Edgardo José Maya Villazón (born July 24, 1951) is a Colombian lawyer, and former Inspector General of Colombia and Controller General of Colombia.

Early years
Edgardo Maya studied in the Gimnasio Moderno high school in Bogotá. After he studied law and graduated from the Universidad Externado de Colombia where he also did postgraduate studies in labor law and social security, among others.

Career
Maya began working as a trial lawyer in the city of Valledupar where he became sectional manager of the Social Security Institute. Later he was appointed President of the Superior Council of the Popular University of Cesar (UPC).

He became a law professor at the Jorge Tadeo Lozano University and Universidad Externado de Colombia in which he taught labor and collective law for undergraduate and graduate students.

He was also an auxiliary magistrate of the Labor Cassation Chamber of the Colombian Supreme Court of Justice. He was also Department of Cesar's Auxiliary Comptroller and member of the Redaction Commission of the Statutory Law for Justice Administration and also participated in the reform to the Unique Disciplinary Code (Law 200 of 1995). In 1999, Maya was a delegate of the International Labour Organization. He later became a magistrate of the Superior Council of the Judicature's Jurisdictional Disciplinary Chamber, as president and vice president.

Inspector General
On January 13, 2001 Maya was appointed Inspector General of Colombia for the 2001–2005 period.

Maya's appointment ceremony took place in the Casa de Nariño Presidential Palace. This reelection was the cause of numerous criticisms

In 2006 and 2007 Maya was questioned by the Colombian media, opposition politicians and others for the involvement of some members of his stepfamily in a parapolitics scandal. His stepson Governor of Cesar Department, Hernando Molina was accused of being part of an AUC paramilitary bloc and for benefiting from the paramilitary support to threaten other candidates running for Governor to resign. His nephew in law and former Senator of Colombia Álvaro Araújo Castro and his father Álvaro Araújo Noguera (Maya's brother in law) were also questioned and indicted in parapolitics related activities.

Comptroller General of the Republic 
Maya was appointed Comptroller General of the Republic on August 19, 2014, and finished his appointment on August, 2018.

See also
 2006–2007 Colombian parapolitics scandal
 Consuelo Araújo

References

External links
 President of Colombia; Edgardo Maya appointed for a second term as Attorney General of Colombia

1951 births
Edgardo
Living people
People from Valledupar
20th-century Colombian judges
Inspectors General of Colombia
Comptrollers General of Colombia
Universidad Externado de Colombia alumni
Academic staff of Universidad Externado de Colombia
Academic staff of Jorge Tadeo Lozano University